Portrait of a Hitman is a 1979 American crime drama film directed by Allan A. Buckhantz and starring Jack Palance, Rod Steiger, Bo Svenson, Ann Turkel, Richard Roundtree. The film was released in France in 1979 and in the US in 1984. In 2002 and 2006, the film was re-released on DVD.

Plot
A ruthless professional hitman (Jack Palance) is invited to kill a brain surgeon (Rod Steiger). Later, it turns out, however, that both men not only know each other very well (the surgeon once saved the hitman's life) but also love the same woman (Ann Turkel). Can the killer fulfill the contract in this case?

Cast
Jack Palance as Jim Buck
Rod Steiger as Max Andreotti
Richard Roundtree as Coco Morrell
Bo Svenson as Dr. Bob Michaels
Ann Turkel as Cathy
Philip Ahn as Wong
Herb Jeffries as Charlie

References

External links

1979 films
1979 crime drama films
American crime drama films
1970s English-language films
1970s American films